Praolia mizutanii is a species of beetle in the family Cerambycidae. It was described by Niisato in 1990. It is known from Japan.

References

Saperdini
Beetles described in 1990